Velainellidae is a very small taxonomic family of fossil sea snails, marine gastropod mollusks in the superfamily Trochoidea, the top snails, turban snails and their allies.

Genera
This family contains only one genus: the Eocene genus Velainella, named by Vasseur 1880 and found in France.

Description
Velainella has a long, narrow, almost straight-side shell with a smooth-lipped oval aperture.

Taxonomy changes
Bouchet & Rocroi, 2005  included the Velainellidae in the vetigastropod superfamily Trochoidea, leaving the rank of the Vetigastropoda undecided.  Previously W. F. Ponder and A. Warén 1988 put the Velainellidae in the Loxonematoidea (Koken 1889) a superfamily in the Mesogastropoda,  Earlier, J. B. Knight, et al., 1960 in the Treatise included the Velainellidae, with Vellainella, in the Trochacea, as does Bouchet & Rocroi, 2005, but within the Archaeogastropoda. Trochacea is the original spelling for what is now Trochoidea.

References 
J.Brookes Knight, et al. 1960. Systematic Descriptions (of gastropods); Treatise on Invertebrate Paleontology, Part I,  Mollusca 1.  Geological Soc of America and University of Kansas Press, 1960. 
Velainellidae -Paleodb

External links
 An image of Velainella columnaris